Michael Bruce Robinson (born August 19, 1956 in Cleveland, Ohio) is a former American football defensive end who played for the Cleveland Browns of the National Football League. He attended Glenville High School in Cleveland, Ohio.

Robinson played college football at the University of Arizona and Oklahoma State University.  He was drafted by Cleveland in the fourth round with the 95th pick in the 1981 NFL Draft. He played for Cleveland in 18 games in the 1981 and 1982 seasons.

External links
NFL.com player page
 Mike Robinson stats

1956 births
Living people
American football defensive ends
Arizona Wildcats football players
Cleveland Browns players
Oklahoma State Cowboys football players
Players of American football from Cleveland